Andrew or Andy Evans may refer to:

 Andrew Evans (pastor) (born 1935), Australian Pentecostal Christian pastor and politician
 Andy Evans (racing driver) (born 1951), American former racing driver
 Andrew Evans, Welsh distance runner and competitor at the 1984 IAAF World Cross Country Championships
 Andy Evans (footballer) (born 1975), Welsh footballer
 Andrew Evans (travel writer) American author
 Andrew Evans (figure skater) (born 1988), Canadian pair skater
 Andrew Evans (discus thrower) (born 1991), American discus thrower
 Andrew Evans (rugby union) (born 1997), South African rugby union player
 The Andrew Evans case of wrongful conviction in the United Kingdom